The following are the football (soccer) events of the year 1977 throughout the world.

Events
 September 14 – Dutch club AZ'67 makes its European debut by defeating Red Boys Differdange (11–1) in the first round of the UEFA Cup, with four goals from midfielder Jan Peters.
Copa Libertadores 1977: Won by Boca Juniors after defeating Cruzeiro 5–4 in a penalty shootout after an aggregate score of 0–0.

Winners club national championship

Asia
  – Al-Esteqlal

Europe
  – Liverpool
  – Nantes
  – Juventus
 
Eredivisie – Ajax
Eerste Divisie – Vitesse
  – Benfica
  – Atlético Madrid
  – Basel
  – Trabzonspor
  – Red Star Belgrade

North America
 – UNAM
 / :
 New York Cosmos (NASL)

Oceania
 - Sydney City

South America
 
Metropolitano – River Plate
Nacional – Independiente
  – São Paulo

European competitions
 European Champions Cup: Liverpool
 UEFA Cup: Juventus
 European Cup Winners' Cup: Hamburger SV

International tournaments
1977 British Home Championship (May 28 – June 4, 1977)

Births

January
 January 2 — Gavin Mahon, English club footballer
 January 7 — Marco Storari, Italian footballer
 January 8 — Francesco Coco, Italian footballer
 January 21 — Paul Weerman, Dutch footballer
 January 21 – Phil Neville, English international footballer

February
 February 5 — Rodrigo Núñez, Chilean footballer
 February 8 — Jan Õun, Estonian footballer
 February 11 — Raivo Nõmmik, Estonian footballer
 February 19 — Gianluca Zambrotta, Italian international footballer
 February 20 — Niklas Storbacka, Finnish footballer
 February 28 — Artur Wichniarek, Polish international footballer

March
 March 17 — Rustam Mustafin, Russian professional football coach, former player

April
 April 9 — Marko Lepik, Estonian footballer
 April 26 — Raphaël Wicky, Swiss international footballer

May
 May 3 — Noel Valladares, Honduran international footballer
 May 7 — Łukasz Sosin, Polish international footballer 
 May 11 — Pablo Gabriel García, Uruguayan international footballer
 May 12 — Aivar Priidel, Estonian footballer
 May 25 — Andre Anis, Estonian footballer
 May 26 — Luca Toni, Italian international footballer

June
 June 13 — Lorenzo Mathiot, Seychellois footballer
 June 15 — Rui Almeida Monteiro, Dutch footballer
 June 27 — Raúl, Spanish international footballer

July
 July 10 — Levan Kobiashvili, Georgian international footballer
 July 12 — Marco Silva, Portuguese football player and manager
 July 24 — Mehdi Mahdavikia, Iranian international footballer
 July 31 — Bolívar Gómez, Ecuadorian footballer

August
 August 16 — Pavel Královec, Czech football referee
 August 17 — Thierry Henry, French international footballer
 August 18 — Denis Solovyov, professional football coach and former player
 August 29 — Frank Broers, Dutch footballer

September
 September 1 — Kwabena Boafo, Ghanaian footballer
 September 17 — Simone Perrotta, Italian international footballer

October
 October 13 — Antonio Di Natale, Italian international footballer
 October 15 — David Trezeguet, French international footballer
 October 20 — Tebogo Mothusi, Botswana footballer
 October 24 — Iván Kaviedes, Ecuadorian footballer
 October 25 — Birgit Prinz, German footballer

November
 November 17 — Paul Shepherd, English footballer
 November 21 — Sidwell Mothea, Lesotho footballer
 November 22 — Michael Preston, English club footballer
 November 23 — David Lucas, English youth international and coach
 November 28 — Fabio Grosso, Italian international footballer

Deaths

January 
 January 18 – Luciano Re Cecconi (38), Italian football (soccer) player (born 1948)

February 
 February 11 – Luigi Bertolini, Italian midfielder, winner of the 1934 FIFA World Cup. (72 ; Aortic aneurysm)

June 
 June 9 – Germano Boettcher Sobrinho, Brazilian goalkeeper, squad member at the 1934 FIFA World Cup. (66)

July 
 July 17 – Billy Gonsalves American international football (soccer player) (born 1908)
 July 23 – Arsenio Erico, Paraguayan international footballer (born 1915)

October
 October 12 – Juan Carlos Calvo, Uruguayan striker, winner of the 1930 FIFA World Cup. (71)

References

 
Association football by year